Bugged is the third studio album by rock band Babybird released in 2000. It was also the last album the band released on the Echo Records label before being dropped. The band subsequently split but re-united once again in 2006 for their fourth studio album Between My Ears There Is Nothing But Music.

The album features the single "The F-Word" which was later used as the theme tune for Gordon Ramsay's television series of the same name.

The song "Getaway" was also used in an episode of Trigger Happy TV.

Track listing 
All tracks by Stephen Jones
 "The F-Word" - 3:03
 "Getaway" - 4:59
 "Out Of Sight" - 4:28
 "Fireflies" - 3:39
 "Eyes In The Back Of Your Head" - 3:53
 "Till You Die" - 3:10
 "Wave Your Hands" - 4:15
 "All I Want Is Love" - 5:17
 "The Way You Are" - 4:51
 "One Dead Groove/The Xmas God Of New York" - 15:24

Personnel
 Steve Bloom – photography
 Ben Castle – horn
 Matt Hay – programming, producer, engineer, mixing, instrumentation
 Ben Hiller – programming, engineer
 Ben Hillier – programming, engineer
 Stephen Jones – producer, instrumentation
 Paul Newton – horn
 Steve Osborne – producer, mixing
 Luke Scott – producer, instrumentation
 Nichol Thompson – horn

References 

Babybird albums
2000 albums
The Echo Label albums